Turay is an English transcription of a West African surname (the French transcription is Touré, another English one is Touray). Notable people with the name include:

Andrew Turay, politician in Sierra Leone
Edward Turay, politician in Sierra Leone
Fatmata Turay, (born 1987), beauty queen who represented Sierra Leone in Miss World 2007 in Sanya, China
Kemoko Turay, American football player
Samori Turay (c. 1830 – 1900), the founder of the Wassoulou Empire, an Islamic state that resisted French rule in West Africa
Sitta Umaru Turay (born 1978), Sierra Leonean journalist and member of the editorial board of the Sierra Express newspaper

Surnames of African origin